Wooden Head is a compilation album by the American rock band the Turtles, consisting of B-sides and previously unreleased songs mostly recorded in the group's early years and in some cases left unfinished.

Background
Wooden Head was first released in 1970 on White Whale Records. It was re-released on vinyl by Rhino Records, which took the opportunity to change the track listing to avoid duplicates in 1984 (RNLP 154). The album was again reissued as a compact disc in 1993 by Repertoire Records, and included seven bonus tracks.

Track listing
"I Can't Stop" (Lambert) – 2:04
"She'll Come Back" (Howard Kaylan) – 2:38
"Get Away" (Portz, Portz) – 2:10
"Wrong from the Start" (Gordon Waller, Peter Asher) – 2:15
"I Get Out of Breath" (P.F. Sloan, Steve Barri) – 3:12
"We'll Meet Again" (Hughie Charles, Ross Parker) – 2:20
"On a Summer's Day" (Al Nichol) – 3:34
"Come Back" (Howard Kaylan) – 2:22
"Say Girl" (Nichol, Portz, Portz) – 2:06
"Tie Me Down" (David Gates) – 2:03
"Wanderin' Kind" (Howard Kaylan) – 2:06

Bonus tracks
"Ain't Gonna Party No More" – 4:55 (recorded 1969)
"Who Would Ever Think That I Would Marry Margaret" – 2:04 (recorded 1969)
"Is It Any Wonder" – 2:32 (recorded 1966)
"There You Sit Lonely" – 3:44 (recorded late 1969)
"Cat in the Window" – 1:39 (recorded 1968)
"Like It or Not" – 3:43 (recorded 1969)
"You Want to Be a Woman" – 3:26 (recorded 1969)

Rhino LP release track listing

Side one
"I Can't Stop" - 2:06
"Grim Reaper of Love" - 2:41
"She'll Come Back" - 2:38
"Is It Any Wonder" - 2:28
"On a Summer's Day" - 3:37
"Come Back" - 2:24

Side two
"Get Away" - 2:10
"I Get Out of Breath" - 3:15
"Tie Me Down" - 2:03
"Wrong from the Start" - 2:15
"Say Girl" - 2:06
"We'll Meet Again" - 2:20

References

The Turtles albums
B-side compilation albums
1969 compilation albums
Albums produced by Bones Howe
White Whale Records compilation albums